Cylindropuntia whipplei (formerly known as Opuntia whipplei, common name Whipple cholla) is a member of the cactus family, Cactaceae.

The Zuni people rub the spines off the fruit and then dry them for winter use. The dried fruit is also ground into a flour, mixed with ground corn meal and made into a mush. Spineless fruits are eaten raw or stewed.

References

External links
Cylindropuntia whipplei photo gallery at Cholla Web

whipplei
Cacti of the United States
Flora of the Southwestern United States
Plants described in 1856
Plants used in Native American cuisine